
Gmina Klimontów is an urban-rural gmina (administrative district) in Sandomierz County, Świętokrzyskie Voivodeship, in south-central Poland.

Villages
Gmina Klimontów contains the villages and settlements of Adamczowice, Beradz, Borek Klimontowski, Byszów, Byszówka, Dziewków, Górki, Góry Pęchowskie, Goźlice, Grabina, Jantoniów, Kępie, Klimontów, Konary, Konary-Kolonia, Krobielice, Kroblice Pęchowskie, Nasławice, Nawodzice, Nowa Wieś, Olbierzowice, Ossolin, Pęchów, Pęchowiec, Płaczkowice, Pokrzywianka, Przybysławice, Rogacz, Rybnica, Śniekozy, Szymanowice Dolne, Szymanowice Górne, Ułanowice, Węgrce Szlacheckie, Wilkowice and Zakrzów.

Neighbouring gminas
Gmina Klimontów is bordered by the gminas of Bogoria, Iwaniska, Koprzywnica, Lipnik, Łoniów, Obrazów, Samborzec and Staszów.

References

 Polish official population figures 2006

Klimontow
Sandomierz County